Sonntag Nunatak is a solitary nunatak located  east-northeast of Hamilton Cliff, Ford Massif, of the Thiel Mountains. The nunatak was observed on December 13, 1959, by Edward Thiel and Campbell Craddock in the course of a United States Antarctic Research Program (USARP) airlifted geophysical traverse along the 88th meridian West. The name was proposed by Thiel and Craddock for Wayne Sonntag, Operations Director at the Geophysical Institute, University of Wisconsin, 1959–61, logistics officer for the airlifted traverse.

References

Nunataks of Ellsworth Land